Telescopus hoogstraali, common names of which include Hoogstraal's cat snake and the Sinai cat snake, is an endangered cat snake species of the family Colubridae. The species is endemic to the Middle East.

Etymology
The specific name, hoogstraali, is in honor of American entomologist and parasitologist Harry Hoogstraal.

Description
T. hoogstraali has a black-coloured neck and head. Its eyes are small with vertical, cat-like pupils. The snake's underbelly is grey and is covered with black spots.

Geographic range
T. hoogstraali is found around the Sinai region, in Egypt and Israel, as well as Jordan.

In Egypt, it is found in Santa Catarina and Gebel Maghara of northern Sinai Peninsula, while in Israel it can be found only in Negev Desert. It is also known from one city in Jordan, Petra.

Habitat

Conservation status
T. hoogstraali is threatened by habitat loss and distribution.

References

Further reading
Schmidt KP, Marx H (1956). "The Herpetology of Sinai". Fieldiana Zoology 39 (4): 21–40. (Telescopus hoogstraali, new species, pp. 33–35, Figures 5 & 6).

Telescopus
Reptiles described in 1956
Taxa named by Karl Patterson Schmidt
Taxonomy articles created by Polbot
Snakes of Jordan